Littleton Township may refer to:

 Littleton Township, Schuyler County, Illinois
 Littleton Township, Halifax County, North Carolina, in Halifax County, North Carolina

Township name disambiguation pages